The Malaysia Cup, formerly known as Malaya Cup, is an annual football tournament in Malaysia, held at the end of the calendar year. The cup was first held in 1921. Despite its prestige and popularity as the nation's oldest cup tournament, it is currently a secondary cup to the Malaysia FA Cup, as Malaysia's slot for continental cup tournament (AFC Cup) is usually allocated to the winner of the Malaysia FA Cup. The competition was previously managed by the Football Association of Malaysia, before it was transferred to the Football Malaysia LLP (now known as the Malaysian Football League) in the 2016 season.

In the 2016 edition, the competition structure changed and only the top eleven teams of the Malaysia Super League and the top five teams of the Malaysia Premier League qualified for the cup.

The current title holder is Johor Darul Ta'zim, who won the 2022 edition.

History 
The Piala Malaysia is one of Asia's longest-running football competitions. Established in 1921, it was known as the Malaya Cup from 1921 to 1967, after the donation of a trophy from the British Royal Navy ship HMS Malaya. The tournament was renamed the Piala Malaysia in 1967. For much of its history, the Cup was contested by Malaysian state teams, military teams as well as foreign invitees Singapore and Brunei. Malaysian club teams were allowed entry into the competition from 2000.

Origins 
In January 1921, the British Royal Navy battleship HMS Malaya called at Port Swettenham (now Port Klang), Singapore, Malacca, Penang and Port Dickson. During its stay, the crew competed in friendly matches in football, rugby, hockey, sailing, and golf against local clubs.

Three months later, the Chief Secretary of the Federated Malay States government received a letter from Captain H. T. Buller of HMS Malaya, which offered two cups to be competed for in football and rugby as tokens of their gratitude for the reception they received in Malaya. The offer was accepted and various club representatives met to organise the tournament.

First tournament 
A Malaya Cup committee was set up and it was decided to run the football competition in northern and southern sections. The first tournament were entrusted to be run  by the Selangor Club. The first ever Malaya Cup match was played on 20 August 1921, with Selangor defeating Penang 5–1 in front of an estimated crowd of 5,000 in Kuala Lumpur. The inaugural tournament were played by six teams and won by Singapore where each Singapore players received a gold badge for their victory.

Pre-war years 
The popularity of the tournament was already apparent in its early years where in 1923, a newspaper described it as “by far the greatest sporting event of the year (in Malaya)”. The final was played outside Kuala Lumpur for the first time in 1925, when Singapore defeated Selangor 2–1 at the Anson Road Stadium. Singapore also maintained a record of appearing in every Malaya Cup final from the first in 1921 to 1941, when the competition was disrupted by World War II.

In September 1926, representatives from the football associations of Selangor, Singapore, Perak, Negeri Sembilan and Malacca agreed to form a Malayan Football Association (MFA). The MFA was based in Kuala Lumpur, with John Sime of Singapore as its first president, and was represented on the Malaya Cup committee which organised the competition. The MFA saw little activity until 1932, when it was revived and reformed as the Football Association of Malaya (FAM). The FAM also took control of the organisation of the Malaya Cup from its founding committee. The same year, the British Services were allowed to enter their own teams, joining Kedah and Johor which were both in the competition by 1930.

Post-war era 
The Malaya Cup resumed in 1948, and the post-war era saw Pahang, Kelantan, Terengganu and Perlis enter the competition. In 1957, the final was played for the first time at the newly constructed Merdeka Stadium. The majority of the finals would be held at the Merdeka Stadium until the 1990s.

In 1959, the Malaya Cup departed from the traditional one round tournament to a two-round home and away format in three zones, East, South and North.

In 1967, the Malaya Cup was retired and replaced with a new trophy, the Piala Malaysia, in line with political developments and since then the competition has been known as the Piala Malaysia. The old Malaya Cup now resides at the National Museum in Kuala Lumpur.

Where previous tournaments had been segmented into geographical zones, the 1979 edition saw every team play each other in a 17-team competition. New entries were Federal Territory (later renamed Kuala Lumpur), the East Malaysian states of Sabah and Sarawak, as well as the independent sultanate of Brunei. A one-round league competition was introduced in Malaysia in 1979. The top four teams at the end of the league will face off in two semi-finals before the winners made it to the finals. In 1981, the quarter-finals stage were introduced. When the league began, it was intended primarily as a qualifying tournament for the Piala Malaysia.

However, only in 1982, the league trophy was awarded to the winners of the league stage. Since then, the Piala Malaysia has been held after the conclusion of the league each year, with only the best-performing teams in the league qualifying for the Piala Malaysia.

Modern era 
In 2003, MPPJ FC became the first club and a non state team to win the cup. Prior to that year, the two teams which made the final had always been representative sides of the regional Football Associations, or military teams.

Teams representing two of Malaysia's neighbouring countries have been involved in the competition. Brunei won the cup in 1999 and continue to be involved though in recent years they have been represented by the club side DPMM FC, whereas initially their team was organised by the Football Association of Brunei. Singapore used to enter a team organised by the Football Association of Singapore. Their team won the cup 24 times and are the second most successful side in the competition's history after Selangor. However, after their last win in 1994, Singapore withdrew from the competition following a dispute with the Football Association of Malaysia over gate receipts and have not been involved since. In 2011, Football Association of Singapore announced that Singapore would be back to join the Piala Malaysia in 2012. On 5 December 2011, Football Association of Singapore had unveiled the new squad list and line up planned for the 2012 edition of Piala Malaysia where LIONSXII was sent to compete.

Privatisation era 
In 2015, Football Malaysia Limited Liability Partnership (FMLLP) was created in the course of privatisation of the Malaysian football league system. The partnership saw all 24 teams of Liga Super and Liga Premier including FAM as the Managing Partner and MP & Silva as a special partner (FAM's global media and commercial advisor) to become stakeholders in the company. FMLLP owns, operates and runs five entities in Malaysian football under its jurisdiction, which include Liga Super, the Liga Premier, the Piala FA, the Piala Malaysia and the Piala Sumbangsih. It aims to transform and move Malaysian football forward.

Champions and finalists 
Below is a list of Malaysia Cup champions and finalists since its inception in 1921.

Performance by teams

See also 
 Malaysia FA Cup
 Piala Sumbangsih
 Piala Emas Raja-Raja

References

External links 
 

 
Football cup competitions in Malaysia
National association football league cups
1921 establishments in British Malaya
Recurring sporting events established in 1921